Stanley Roy Waxman (May 20, 1922 – February 22, 2013) was an American professional basketball player. He played for the Tri-Cities Blackhawks in the National Basketball League during the 1946–47 season and averaged 7.1 points per game. He also played for teams in the American Basketball League, Professional Basketball League of America, the New York State Professional Basketball League, and in independent semi-pro leagues. In 1948–49, Waxman served as a player-coach for the Utica Olympics.

References

1922 births
2013 deaths
American Basketball League (1925–1955) players
American men's basketball players
United States Army personnel of World War II
Basketball coaches from New York (state)
Basketball players from New York City
Guards (basketball)
LIU Brooklyn Blackbirds men's basketball players
Player-coaches
Professional Basketball League of America players
Sportspeople from Brooklyn
Tri-Cities Blackhawks players
Utica Olympics players
Utica Pioneers men's basketball coaches